Argania is a genus of moths of the family Erebidae. The genus was erected by Herbert Druce in 1891.

Species
Argania albimacula Dognin, 1914 Peru
Argania pilosa H. Druce, 1891 Guatemala

References

Hypeninae